Marigona Zani (born 5 July 1996) is a German-born Albanian footballer who plays as a goalkeeper for TSV Jahn Calden in the Frauen-Regionalliga Süd.

See also
List of Albania women's international footballers

References

External links 
 
 German league stats - FuPa

1996 births
Living people
Albanian women's footballers
Women's association football goalkeepers
Albania women's international footballers
German women's footballers
German people of Albanian descent
Sportspeople of Albanian descent